Stary Oryebash (İśke Uryabaş) is a rural locality (a village) in Tyuldinsky Selsoviet, Kaltasinsky District, Bashkortostan, Russia. The population was 297 as of 2010. There are 4 streets.

Geography 
Stary Oryebash is located 20 km north of Kaltasy (the district's administrative centre) by road. Kyrpy is the nearest rural locality.

References 

Rural localities in Kaltasinsky District